Bruce Edward McLeod (30 January 1940 – 1 May 1996) was a New Zealand rugby union player. A hooker, McLeod represented Counties at a provincial level, and was a member of the New Zealand national side, the All Blacks, from 1964 to 1970. He played 46 matches for the All Blacks including 24 internationals.

References

1940 births
1996 deaths
Rugby union players from Auckland
People educated at Otahuhu College
New Zealand rugby union players
New Zealand international rugby union players
Counties Manukau rugby union players
Hawke's Bay rugby union players
Rugby union hookers